Carrierea calycina is a species of tree in the willow family. It is native to China. Common names include goat horn tree in English and yang jiao shu in Mandarin.

References

External links
UBC Botany Photo of the Day

Salicaceae
Trees of China
Taxa named by Adrien René Franchet